The Peterborough Lakers are Junior "A" box lacrosse team from Peterborough, Ontario, Canada.  The Lakers play in the OLA Junior A Lacrosse League.

History

Peterborough Filter Queens 1950–1952
Peterborough Pat's 1953
Peterborough Pete's 1954-1956
Peterborough UEW's 1957–1958
Peterborough Pete's 1959–1960
Hastings Legionnaires 1961–1967
Peterborough Petes 1968
Peterborough Tee-Pees 1969–1973
Peterborough Gray-Munros 1974–1979
Peterborough Century 21 1980–1981

Peterborough James Gang 1982–1984
Peterborough Maulers 1985–1993
Peterborough Traders 1994
Peterborough Javelins 1995–1998
Peterborough Lakers 1999 to Present

Season-by-season results
Note: GP = Games played, W = Wins, L = Losses, T = Ties, Pts = Points, GF = Goals for, GA = Goals against

References

External links
Lakers Webpage
The Bible of Lacrosse
Unofficial OLA Page

Ontario Lacrosse Association teams
Sport in Peterborough, Ontario